Neela Kuyil is a 1995 Tamil-language drama film directed by Alleppey Ashraf. The film stars Pandiarajan and Rajashree, with Manorama, Radha Ravi, Vennira Aadai Moorthy, Senthil, Vadivelu and Y. G. Mahendra playing supporting roles. It is a remake of the Malayalam film Ninnistham Ennishtam which itself was inspired by Charlie Chaplin's City Lights . The film was released on 23 October 1995.

Plot 

Muthusamy is a poor and not-too-good-looking man, he is roaming the streets. Kaattayi, an old woman and street astrologer, becomes his friend and she gives him money to eat every day. Muthusamy lost his parents at young age. One day, he meets Shalini a blind flower seller and Muthusamy befriends the innocent Shalini, he introduces himself as a rich business magnate. Shalini has a brother : Veerasamy, a dreaded rowdy. Muthusamy slowly falls in love with Shalini. He decides to pay for her surgery to repair Shalini's eyes : he worked day and night and sold his mother's gold pendant. The police suspect Muthusamy of stealing that gold pendant and arrests him, before being arrested he manages to give his money to Shalini. After the successful surgery, Shalini can see but Muthusamy is not there to see her happiness.

Shalini becomes friends with the doctor Raja who operated her eyes. Raja finds her voice sweet, and recommend her to his friend Raja, a music director. The first song Shalini sang becomes a chartbuster and she becomes the busiest singer of the cinema industry. After being released from jail, Muthusamy tries to meet Shalini. What transpires next forms the rest of the story.

Cast 

Pandiarajan as Muthusamy
Rajashree as Shalini
Manorama as Kaattayi
Radha Ravi as Raja
Vennira Aadai Moorthy as Kannayiram
Senthil
Vadivelu as Mambattiyan
Y. G. Mahendra as Madhan
Pasi Narayanan
Vellai Subbaiah
Karuppu Subbiah
Joker Thulasi

Soundtrack 

The soundtrack was composed by Surya (Vazhuvoor Manikka Vinayagam), with lyrics written by Vaali.

Reception
Thulasi of Kalki wrote today everyone believes in grandeur. They believe in great heroes. The director of this film relies on story and poignant sentiment. More than that he relies on the screenplay. Hope is not wasted.

References 

1995 films
1990s Tamil-language films
Indian drama films
Tamil remakes of Malayalam films
Films directed by Alleppey Ashraf